Several empires in human history have been contenders for the largest of all time, depending on definition and mode of measurement. Possible ways of measuring size include area, population, economy, and power. Of these, area is the most commonly used because it has a fairly precise definition and can be feasibly measured with some degree of accuracy. Estonian political scientist Rein Taagepera, who published a series of academic articles about the territorial extents of historical empires between 1978 and 1997, defined an empire as "any relatively large sovereign political entity whose components are not sovereign" and its size as the area over which the empire has some undisputed military and taxation prerogatives. The list is not exhaustive owing to a lack of available data for several empires; for this reason and because of the inherent uncertainty in the estimates, no rankings are given.

Largest empires by land area 

Empires at their greatest extent 
Empire size in this list is defined as the dry land area it controlled at the time, which may differ considerably from the area it claimed. For example: in the year 1800, European powers collectively claimed approximately % of the Earth's land surface that they did not effectively control. Where estimates vary, entries are sorted by the lowest estimate. Where more than one entry has the same area, they are listed alphabetically.

Timeline of largest empires to date 
The earliest empire which can with certainty be stated to have been larger than all previous empires was that of Upper and Lower Egypt, which covered ten times the area of the previous largest civilisation around the year 3000 BC.

Timeline of largest empires at the time

Largest empires by share of world population 
Because of the trend of increasing world population over time, absolute population figures are less relevant for comparison between different empires than their respective shares of the world population at the time. For the majority of the time since roughly 400 BC, the two most populous empires' combined share of the world population has been 30–40%. Most of the time, the most populous empire has been located in China.

See also 
 List of political and geographic subdivisions by total area
 List of countries and dependencies by area
 Political history of the world

References 

Empires
Empires, largest
History-related lists of superlatives
Largest things